Å or Å Sentrum is a village in the municipality of Orkland in Trøndelag county, Norway.

Å, has the postal address 7335 Jerpstad, to distinguish it from other places named Å. Agriculture is one of the village's most important industries. A person named Jo Aa, who died in the 1990s, lived in the village of Å, and he had the shortest name in Norway.

Name
The village (originally a farm) is first mentioned around 1435 "af Aam" (dative plural). The name is from the Old Norse Ár, the plural of á, meaning "(small) river". The name refers to the fact that the farm is lying between two rivers: the Orkla River and Reisa River. Until 1917, Å was spelled Aa.

References

Orkland
Villages in Trøndelag